

Buildings and structures

Buildings

 1100 – Gloucester Cathedral dedicated as a new Gloucester Abbey church in England, but seriously damaged by a fire in the city in 1102.
 1102
 Old Cathedral, Salamanca founded.
 Tewkesbury Abbey in England begun.
 1104 – New basilica at Vézelay Abbey in France dedicated.
 1105 – The Romanesque Bayeux Cathedral is partially destroyed by a fire, marking the beginning of Gothic style reconstructions.
 1106 – Rebuilt Speyer Cathedral completed.
 1106–1108 – Gate Church of the Trinity (Pechersk Lavra) in Kiev built.
 1107
 Basilica of Saint-Martin d'Ainay, Lyon consecrated.
 San Savino, Piacenza, rebuilt.
 1108 – Southwell Minster in England begun.

Events
 1103 – Chinese architect and government minister Li Jie publishes his Yingzao Fashi, a technical treatise on Chinese architecture during the reign of Emperor Huizong of Song.

Births

Deaths
 1110 – Li Jie, Chinese architect (born 1065)

References 

12th-century architecture
1100s works